Gwyn Davies may refer to:
 Gwyn Davies (cricketer)
 Gwyn Davies (rugby)
 Gwyn Davies (Arrowverse)

See also 
 Gwynfor Davies